Raymond is a town in Rockingham County, New Hampshire, United States. The population was 10,684 at the 2020 census. Part of Pawtuckaway State Park is in the north.

The main village in town, where 3,738 people resided at the 2020 census, is defined as the Raymond census-designated place (CDP), and is located along the Lamprey River near New Hampshire Route 27.

History 

The town was first settled by families from Exeter as a parish of Chester, and known as "Freetown" because it was exempt from the usual obligation of reserving its tall pine trees for masts in the Royal Navy. The town was incorporated in 1764 by colonial governor Benning Wentworth.

There are at least two theories regarding the source of the town's name. The earlier theory, stated by Joseph Fullonton in his History of Raymond, published 1875, is that the name was chosen as "a new and classical one". Fullonton relates that the original name of Freetown "arose from the ship timber business" where the king claimed the best trees. The locals had other ideas and took the trees and "being successful here, none molesting, they called it Freetown." Fullonton states that at incorporation in 1764, changing the name from "Freetown" to "Raymond" was "taking a new and classical one, shows that there are minds not disposed to tread all the time in one path, but capable of thinking and advancing," and that the word "Raymond" means "the lustrous, luminous or shining world."

In a second theory, the town was named for Captain William Rayment, or Raymond, of Beverly, Massachusetts, who had raised a company of soldiers to fight in the war against Canada in 1690. The Massachusetts General Court in 1735 granted Captain Raymond and his company a township called "Beverly-Canada" (now Weare) as payment for their services, but that claim was ruled invalid after New Hampshire separated from Massachusetts in 1741. So in 1767, heirs of the veterans were instead awarded land in Maine. Originally called "Raymondtown Plantation", it today composes the Maine towns of Raymond, Casco and part of Naples.

In 1906, Andrew Carnegie awarded a grant of $2,000 toward the construction of a Carnegie library in Raymond, and in 1908 the Dudley-Tucker Library opened overlooking the Common.

The Concord and Portsmouth Railroad line from Concord to Portsmouth reached Raymond in 1861. In 1862 the alignment was altered, rerouting trains to Manchester rather than Concord. However, freight and passenger trains still originated in Concord and traveled south on the New Hampshire Division Main Line before entering the Portsmouth Branch at Manchester. The line later became the Portsmouth Branch of the Boston and Maine Railroad. Passenger service ended in 1954, with mixed train service continuing until 1960. Local freight service continued regularly until 1972 and as-needed afterwards, usually once or twice a week. A large gravel pit located near Onway Lake was a busy railroad customer until closing in 1971, as was the Regis Tannery downtown until a fire the same year. There were no regular rail customers in Raymond from 1971 until 1976, when Rehrig Pacific opened a plastics injection plant near Route 102. The last train served Raymond on July 31, 1980, and the tracks through town were abandoned in 1982 and removed between 1983 and 1985.  The line is now a rail trail, and the restored depot survives today as home to the Raymond Historical Society.

New Hampshire Historical Marker #273 in Raymond recognizes Frank J. Mafera, a resident who patented the first method for weaving chain link fencing in 1930, and then founded the Barnyard Fence Company (later renamed the New Hampshire Fence Company) in Raymond.

Geography
Raymond is drained by the Lamprey River and the Exeter River, both part of the Piscataqua River watershed.

The town is crossed by state routes 27, 101, 102, 107, and 156.

Demographics

As of the census of 2010, there were 10,138 people, 3,925 households, and 2,796 families residing in the town. There were 4,254 housing units, of which 329, or 7.7%, were vacant. The racial makeup of the town was 97.0% white, 0.7% African American, 0.2% Native American, 0.6% Asian, 0.01% Native Hawaiian or Pacific Islander, 0.2% some other race, and 1.4% from two or more races. 1.1% of the population were Hispanic or Latino of any race.

Of the 3,925 households, 32.3% had children under the age of 18 living with them, 55.7% were headed by married couples living together, 9.8% had a female householder with no husband present, and 28.8% were non-families. 20.8% of all households were made up of individuals, and 6.5% were someone living alone who was 65 years of age or older. The average household size was 2.58, and the average family size was 2.98.

In the town, 21.7% of the population were under the age of 18, 8.5% were from 18 to 24, 27.5% from 25 to 44, 32.7% from 45 to 64, and 9.5% were 65 years of age or older. The median age was 39.9 years. For every 100 females, there were 100.5 males. For every 100 females age 18 and over, there were 100.4 males.

For the period 2011–2015, the estimated median annual income for a household was $64,490, and the median income for a family was $77,345. Male full-time workers had a median income of $52,104 versus $34,484 for females. The per capita income for the town was $29,476. 6.9% of the population and 3.6% of families were below the poverty line. 7.2% of the population under the age of 18 and 5.8% of those 65 or older were living in poverty.

Notable people
 Chris Carpenter (b.1975), former baseball pitcher for the St. Louis Cardinals, raised in town
 Frank J. Mafera (1898-1956), inventor of residential chain link fencing

References

Further reading

External links
 
 Dudley-Tucker Library
 Raymond Historical Society & Museum
 New Hampshire Economic and Labor Market Information Bureau Profile

 
Towns in Rockingham County, New Hampshire
Towns in New Hampshire